Bruce Douglas Haigh (born 6 August 1945) is an Australian political commentator and former diplomat. He joined the Australian Department of Foreign Affairs in 1972 and served in South Africa.

Working life
Haigh was posted to South Africa as Second Secretary (1976–79). He initiated Australian Embassy contact with members of the black South African resistance, including the Black Consciousness Movement in 1976. Included amongst the contacts he made at this time were Steve Biko (murdered by police whilst being held in detention in 1977) and Dr. Mamphela Ramphele (Vice Chancellor of the University of Cape Town and a Director of the World Bank). Haigh helped banned newspaper editor, Donald Woods, escape from South Africa. His role in that escape was portrayed by Australian actor John Hargreaves in the film Cry Freedom, produced and directed by Richard Attenborough.

References

1945 births
Living people
Australian diplomats